MAFC (Műegyetemi Atlétikai és Football Club) is a Hungarian men's basketball club based in Budapest. MAFC was an active member of the Hungarian Basketball League since 1934, and the club has participated continuously in all seasons since then, almost always in the first division. As a result, is the third most successful club in the Hungarian basketball league with 7 national championships, 23 silver medals and 10 bronze medals. However, lately the club has hit a hard spell, with them currently comepting in the third division.

Honours
Total Titles: 12

Domestic competitions
Hungarian League
  (7): 1935–36, 1944, 1949–50, 1951, 1956, 1970, 1975
  (23): 1934–35, 1937–38, 1943, 1946–47, 1947–48, 1948–49, 1950, 1952, 1953, 1955, 1957, 1958–59, 1959–60, 1960–61, 1962–63, 1964, 1965, 1966, 1967, 1974, 1981–82, 1982–83, 1984–85
  (10): 1936–37, 1945–46, 1954, 1957–58, 1968, 1969, 1973, 1978, 1979, 1980–81
Hungarian Cup
 Winners (5): 1965, 1970, 1972, 1979, 1981

Basketball teams in Hungary
Basketball teams established in 1934
Sport in Budapest